Heinrichswalde is a municipality in the Vorpommern-Greifswald district, in Mecklenburg-Vorpommern, Germany.

People 
 Harry Tisch (1927-1995), East German politician

References

Vorpommern-Greifswald